Darren Davis may refer to:

 Darren Davis (Canadian football) (born 1977), running back in the Canadian Football League
 Darren Davis (footballer) (born 1967), English former footballer
 Darren G. Davis (born 1968), American independent comic book publisher and writer

See also
Darren Davies (disambiguation)